John Richards (April 13, 1765 – April 18, 1850) was an American politician from New York.

Life
Richards was born in Llanuwchllyn, Gwynedd, Wales, where he became a schoolmaster. He emigrated to the United States and settled in Johnsburg where he again taught school.  Richards served as Warren County's judge of the court of common pleas from 1805 to 1850.  He was town supervisor of Johnsburg, first in 1807 and then for several more terms.

He was a member from Washington County of the New York State Assembly in 1811, and from Washington and Warren counties in 1814 and 1814-15. In 1817, he removed to Lake George. Richards was a delegate to the New York State Constitutional Convention of 1821.

Richards was elected as a Crawford Democratic-Republican to the 18th United States Congress, holding office from March 4, 1823, to March 3, 1825.

He died on April 18, 1850, in Lake George, Warren County, New York, and was buried at the John Richards Cemetery.

Notes

Sources

The New York Civil List compiled by Franklin Benjamin Hough (pages 58, 71, 185, 189f and 299; Weed, Parsons and Co., 1858)

External links

1765 births
1850 deaths
Members of the New York State Assembly
People from Warren County, New York
Welsh emigrants to the United States
People from Gwynedd
Democratic-Republican Party members of the United States House of Representatives from New York (state)